ODAS may refer to:
Outdoor distributed antenna system
OCA-DLR Asteroid Survey
Oceanographic Data Acquisition System, a system used by a certain class of US Navy ships
Ocean Data Acquisition System, a fixed-point ocean-based meteorological monitoring device